The 77th Shushi Separate Battalion or Shushi Independent Battalion is a unit of the Artsakh Defence Army. It was formed on 1 September 1992, originally consisting of over 1,000 soldiers including many from the Armenian diaspora. Most soldiers in the battalion were members of the ARF. It took part in Operation Horadiz.

The battalion in modern Artsakh 
A memorial to the fallen military personnel from the battalion was erected on the southern top of Mount Aragats in 2003.  After the 2016 Nagorno-Karabakh clashes, the ARF helped the Ministry of Defense of Armenia in setting up a volunteer reserve battalion, tracing back its heritage from the Shushi independent battalion.

See also 

 Armenian volunteer units during the First Nagorno-Karabakh War

References 

Military units and formations established in 1992
Military units and formations of the Republic of Artsakh